Koluel Kayke  is a village and municipality in Santa Cruz Province in southern Argentina.

References

Populated places in Santa Cruz Province, Argentina